"Smiling" is a song by Canadian-American singer Alanis Morissette co-written by Morissette and Michael Farrell. It was one of two new songs written for the Broadway adaptation of Morissette's 1995 album, Jagged Little Pill, and later released as the second single from her ninth studio album, Such Pretty Forks in the Road, on February 21, 2020. The album's title is taken from a lyric in this song. Morissette subsequently released a duet version of the song featuring  Jagged Little Pill actress Elizabeth Stanley with the rest of the cast on backing vocals.

Tracklist
F9 Remix Single
"Smiling" (F9 Radio Remix) - 3:27
"Smiling" (F9 Club Remix) - 5:27

Bil Bless Remix Single
"Smiling" (Bil Bless Remix) (with Elizabeth Stanley and Original Broadway Cast of Jagged Little Pill) - 4:40

Elizabeth Stanley & Jagged Little Pill version
"Smiling" (with Elizabeth Stanley and Original Broadway Cast of Jagged Little Pill) - 3:52

In Jagged Little Pill
In Jagged Little Pill, the song appears in the first act sung by Mary Jane (MJ) Healy, the matriarch of a suburban Connecticut family. In the scene, she is singing about her feelings of having to keep up appearances while dealing with the pressures of motherhood and everyday life, as well as struggling with an addiction to painkillers following a car accident. The song is sung right after a pharmacist refuses to provide further pain medication as her prescription has run out. Desperate, she buys opioids off the street from a familiar dealer. During the song, MJ's day is shown in reverse, detailing her life and addiction from unpacking groceries to the street deal to running out of medication in the morning.

Charts

Release history

See also
"My Iron Lung", the original song by Radiohead.

References

2020 singles
Songs from musicals
Alanis Morissette songs
Songs written by Alanis Morissette
Songs about parenthood